Philip Boteler may refer to:

 Sir Philip Boteler, 3rd Baronet ( 1667–1719), MP for Hythe
 Sir Philip Boteler, 4th Baronet ( 1695–1772), of the Boteler baronets
 Captain Philip or Phillip Boteler of HMS Ardent
 Philip Butler or Boteler (died 1545), Member of Parliament

See also
Boteler (surname)